Greg Todd is an American college basketball coach and is currently in his second season as the women's basketball head coach at Eastern Kentucky University which is located in Richmond, Kentucky and is a member of the ASUN Conference in the NCAA's Division I.

Biography
Todd is a native of Berea, Kentucky and a 1978 graduate Berea Community High School. At Berea Community High School, Todd starred on the basketball court where he set still-standing school records for scoring (1,683) and rebounding (966). Following high school, Todd attended Eastern Kentucky University where he graduated in 1984. He and his wife, Renee, have three children, Brooke, Katie, and Robert (Robby). Brooke is a 2018 graduate of Morehead State University where she played four seasons for her father and finished her career ranked second in blocked shots. Katie currently attends Morehead State and is an active member of multiple student organizations on campus.

Coaching career
Todd began his head coaching career at his alma mater, Berea Community High. From 1992-99, Todd led the Lady Pirates to a record of 166–54 and seven 20-win seasons. Todd's 1998 BCHS team achieved the best finish in school history during the 1997-98 campaign as it advanced to the semi-final round of the 1998 KHSAA Kentucky Sweet Sixteen Tournament where it fell to eventual champion, Elizabethtown. In 1999,  Todd took over the women's basketball program at Lexington Catholic High. From 1999-06, the coach compiled a stellar 225–26 record which included three KHSAA Kentucky State Championships (2001,05,06) and two runner-up finishes. Todd's 2005-06 team would earn the coach national recognition as the EA Sports  National Coach of the Year award as it finished 35-1 on its way to a championship and a KHSAA record #3 ranking in the final USA Today national girls' basketball poll. The team featured five All-State players and seven players that signed scholarships to play in Division I. Todd finished his 14 seasons coaching in the high school ranks with a combined record of 391-80 (.830) and is the only coach in KHSAA girls' basketball history to win over 375 games and have less than 100 losses.

In July 2017, Todd's achievements coaching high school basketball were recognized as he was inducted into the Kentucky High School Basketball Hall of Fame in Owensboro, Kentucky. In 2019, Todd was inducted into the Berea Community School Athletics Hall of Fame as well as the Lexington Catholic High School Hall of Fame. 

Following his run at Lexington Catholic, Todd moved into the collegiate coaching ranks at Division III Transylvania University beginning in 2006-07 season. Todd took over a team that had a losing record the previous season and immediately improved them to a 19–9 record and a third-place finish in the Heartland Collegiate Athletic Conference. After nearly upsetting conference champion Manchester in the conference tournament final, Transylvania received the first of the three invitations to the NCAA Women's Division III Basketball Championship it would get during Todd's tenure. In his eight seasons at Transylvania, his teams won three conferences regular season and two tournament championships, accumulating a record of 157–64.

In Todd's first season leading the Morehead State Eagles, his team was picked to finish last in the twelve-team race, but finished 8–8 and in sixth place after fading from an early third place. In 2018–2019 Todd had arguably his best season as a coach as he led the Eagles to a 24-11 year capped off by a WNIT bid, only the second ever in program history. In the opening round, the Eagles traveled to Columbus, OH, to play the Big Ten's Ohio State Buckeyes. After trailing most of the first half, Todd's team fought back to score an upset win over the Buckeyes 71-61, which many would consider being the program's biggest victory in the modern era. Todd's Eagles then traveled to Bowling Green KY. to face Western Kentucky and eventually lost in heartbreaking fashion against the Hilltoppers in the round of 32 by a score of 68-65.

While at Morehead State, Todd has coached five players to First-Team All-OVC honors, two players to Second-Team All-OVC honors, two All-OVC Newcomer Team members, and one All-OVC Tournament Team member. 

Todd has also helped the program achieve unparalleled recruiting victories as it has signed four previous ESPN Top 100 players.

Head coaching record
Source:

 OVC 2017-18 Women's Basketball Standings

References

External links
 Eagles women's basketball webpage

Living people
American women's basketball coaches
Basketball coaches from Kentucky
High school basketball coaches in the United States
Morehead State Eagles women's basketball coaches
People from Berea, Kentucky
Year of birth missing (living people)
Eastern Kentucky Colonels women's basketball coaches